Diaphana is a genus of gastropods belonging to the family Diaphanidae.

The genus has almost cosmopolitan distribution.

Species:

Diaphana abyssalis 
Diaphana anderssoni 
Diaphana brazieri 
Diaphana californica 
Diaphana caribaea 
Diaphana cretica 
Diaphana flava 
Diaphana floridana 
Diaphana glacialis 
Diaphana globosa 
Diaphana haini 
Diaphana hiemalis 
Diaphana inflata 
Diaphana lactea 
Diaphana lottae 
Diaphana makarovi 
Diaphana marshalli 
Diaphana mauretaniensis 
Diaphana minuta 
Diaphana pacifica 
Diaphana paessleri 
Diaphana pfefferi 
Diaphana tasmanica

References

Gastropods